Yasser Elshantaf (born January 20, 1983) is a Palestinian- German entrepreneur and political activist.

Early life and education

Yasser Elshantaf  was born in Al-Shati camp in Gaza Strip. His parents became refugees after they fled their homes in Jaffa during the 1948 Arab-Israeli War. He studied computer information systems, political science and crisis management.

In 2009, he traveled to Germany after winning the Konrad-Zuse-Program as an entrepreneur. The prize was presented by the German Foreign Office, and focuses on research and development in the information technology field.

Career

Elshantaf started his career in Palestine as IT consultant and served in various capacities in the field of organizational development and strategy. Since 2004, he carried out consulting projects for the World Bank, European Union, and the American Friends Service Committee.

On 29 January 2014, Elshantaf talked to Deutsche Welle   about the public concern over China's growing economic power, classification criteria for leading companies, and challenges facing the German private sector.

On 29 and 30 March 2012, Elshantaf was invited by the German Foundation for International Legal Cooperation and Center for International Peace Operations to a workshop under the title of Corruption and Compliance in Transition Countries in North Africa to talk about strategies and best practices for international legal cooperation in the fight against corruption in transitional societies.

Elshantaf participated in the 12th German-Arab Business Forum, which was held in cooperation between the Arab-German Chamber of Commerce and the German Chamber of Commerce and Industry.He presented a lecture under the title "ICT, the future for Palestine".

Elshantaf is a co-founder of the German-Palestinian Business Council DPW e.V.; a member of the International Non-Profit Business Association for CEOs and Entrepreneurs, the Junior Chamber International, Chamber of Commerce and Industry of Berlin, and the Palestinian Information Technology Association. He has also been involved in many activities supporting the community and the Palestinian economy.

Politics 
Elshantaf participated as an electoral candidate in the postponed 2021 Palestinian legislative election within the independent electoral list "Maan Qadiroon / Together We Can" headed by Dr .Salam Fayyad.

References

External links

Yasser Elshantaf, Diaspora documentary Alghad TV, 7 April 2018
Yasser Elshantaf, How affecting the new employment law for workers coming from Eastern Europe Deutsche Welle, Made in Germany - The Business Magazine, 15 November 2017
Yasser Elshantaf, Innovative ideas Deutsche Welle, Shabab Talk, 3 September 2014
Immigration to Germany Deutsche Welle, Shabab Talk, 22 January 2014
Yasser Elshantaf, Mobaderoon Entrepreneur Magazine in Gaza, 2013
Strategies and best practices for international legal cooperation in the fight against corruption, Center for International Peace Operations in Berlin, 30 March 2012
Yasser Elshantaf, Konrad Zuse Scholarship Programme Donia Al-Watan, 2009
Public Symposium, Geneva 2009. United Nations Conference on Trade and Development in Geneva, 12 August 2009
PED Project, An Assessment of the Outsourcing Capabilities of the Palestinian ICT Industry April 21 - May 3, 2008
Yasser Elshantaf, the CEO Clubs International

1983 births
Living people
People from Gaza Governorate
Palestinian businesspeople
Businesspeople from Berlin